Panapakkam Village (607108) is a village panchayat in Panruti Taluk of Cuddalore District of Tamil Nadu, India.

The 2011 Census of India determined that there were 3122 residents, 1568 male and 1554 female, in 650 households.

Agriculture is the major occupation, along with dairy farming. Sugarcane, tapioca, casuarina, guava (L49 variety), coconut, Borassus (palmyra palm), mango, maize corn, Eleusine coracana (Ragi), and Moringa oleifera (drumstick tree) are some of the crops cultivated here. As per 1972 revenue survey, the village has a total land area of 470 hectares and 17 ares. The major source of water is ground water through bore wells; there are also many ponds and a major lake (55 acres), part of which is under the Tamil Nadu Forest Department.

The village is under Pudupet/Puthupet Post Office jurisdiction.

Tamil and Telugu are the common languages here, with Tamil speakers being in the majority.

Roads leading to nearby villages were recently laid (2018/19) and are in good shape. Most of the streets have cement road facility as well.  Major transportation consists of private vehicles, and a minibus service to Panruti operates throughout the day.  Panruti, Cuddalore, Villupuram, Pondicherry, and Neyveli are the nearest towns. The village of Kanisapakkam and Panapakkam are managed by same VAO.

Thirukameswaran (திருக்காமேஸ்வரர் கோயில்) temple is a famous Shiva temple here. Kaniswarar temple is another nearby famous temple.

This village received electrification in 1960.

See also
Panapakkam, Vellore district, Tamil Nadu

References 

Villages in Cuddalore district